The 2019–20 season was the club's second consecutive season in the top tier of Scottish football since being promoted from the Scottish Championship at the end of the 2017–18 season. St Mirren also competed in the League Cup and the Scottish Cup.

On 18 May, the season was formally ended after 30 games, due to the COVID-19 Coronavirus outbreak. Saints finished 9th after average points per game played was used to determine final league placings.

Season review

May
On 28 May, defender Anton Ferdinand confirmed that he would leave Saints when his contract expired in the summer. The experienced defender made 19 appearances in his time at the club. Also on this day, Saints were drawn with Dunfermline Athletic, Albion Rovers, Edinburgh City and East Kilbride in Group H of the Betfred Cup. On 30 May, left back Adam Eckersley joined Scottish League One side Airdrieonians after his contract expired. The defender made a total of 42 appearances for the club, scoring twice. He also played a major role in helping Saints win the 2017–18 Scottish Championship. On 31 May, Jimmy Nicholl left his role as first team coach, to become assistant manager at Dundee.

June
On 3 June, Saints announced that loanees Anders Dreyer, Brad Lyons, Danny Rogers, Duckens Nazon, Jordan Holmes, Kyle McAllister, Laurențiu Corbu, Lee Hodson and Mihai Popescu had all returned to their parent clubs, and striker Simeon Jackson left the club when his contract expired. On 26 June, following much media speculation, manager Oran Kearney left the club by 'mutual consent', despite having two years of his contract left. Also on this day, defender Gary MacKenzie signed a one-year contract extension with Saints, and goalkeeper Dean Lyness rejoined the club on a two-year deal after leaving in September 2018 to join Raith Rovers. On 28 June, former Saints captain Jim Goodwin was appointed the club's new manager after leaving Alloa Athletic, signing a three-year deal. Another former Saint, Lee Sharp, also joins as Goodwin's assistant.

July
On 4 July, defender Mateo Mužek left Saints and joined Sheriff Tiraspol of Moldova on a free transfer. Also on this day, striker Tony Andreu signed a one-year deal with the club, after being released by Coventry City. On 12 July, after a successful trial with the club, midfielder Oan Djorkaeff signed a one-year deal. On 19 July, defender Josh Heaton left the club by mutual consent, after only making two appearances since signing a three-year deal at the beginning of last season. On 30 July, Turkish midfielder İlkay Durmuş signed on a two-year deal from Austrian side, Wacker Innsbruck.

August
On 1 August, midfielder Sam Foley signed on a two-year deal, after being released by Northampton Town. Also on this day, striker Cody Cooke was ruled out for up to nine months, due to ruptured knee ligaments. On 2 August, striker Jonathan Obika joined the club on a two-year deal from Oxford United. Also on this day, defender Sean McLoughlin signed on a six-month loan from Hull City. On 9 August, former Saint Kyle McAllister re-signed for the club on a three-year deal, and defender Calum Waters signed on a one-year loan from Kilmarnock. On 22 August, Jamaican striker Junior Morias signed from Northampton Town on a two-year contract for an undisclosed fee.

September
On 2 September, defender Jack Baird signed for rivals Greenock Morton on a short-term loan. On 3 September, former Saint Kirk Broadfoot signed a two-year contract with the club, after being released by Kilmarnock.

October
On 18 October, midfielder Cameron MacPherson signed a two-year contract extension, keeping him at the club until 2022. On 29 October,  Jim Kellerman left the club by mutual consent. He joined the club in May 2018 and made seven appearances, scoring once.

December
On 31 December, on-loan defender Sean McLoughlin returned to parent club Hull City at the end of his loan period. He played 21 times for the club, scoring once.

January
On 7 January, Saints signed Irish duo Jamie McGrath and Conor McCarthy on two-and-a-half year deals. Midfielder McGrath signed from Dundalk, and defender McCarthy moves from Cork City. Also on this day, defender Jack Baird extended his loan at Greenock Morton until the end of the season. On 8 January, defender Akin Famewo signed on loan until the end of the season from Norwich City.
On 24 January, midfielder Kyle Magennis injured his knee during a 1–0 defeat to Rangers, and it was announced that he would miss the rest of the season.
On 28 January, 20-year-old Slovakian goalkeeper Peter Urminský sign from Spartak Trnava on an 18-month deal.
On 30 January, defender Lee Hodson returned to the club for a second spell, after signing on loan until the end of the season from Gillingham. On 31 January, striker Alex Jakubiak joined Saints on loan until the end of the season from Watford, while youngster Ethan Erhahon joined Barnsley on loan and defender Paul McGinn joined Hibernian on an 18-month deal.
Also on this day, veteran defender Kirk Broadfoot left the club to rejoin Kilmarnock after leaving them just four months earlier to sign for Saints.

February
On 1 February, Saints signed forward Seifedin Chabbi on loan until the end of the season from Turkish side Gaziantep. On 7 February, it was announced that Ryan Flynn suffered cruciate ligament damage in a match against Hamilton, which effectively ended his season. On 29 February, the club were knocked out of the Scottish Cup by Aberdeen.

March
On 13 March, the Scottish football season was suspended until further notice, due to the coronavirus pandemic.

May
On 18 May, the season was formally ended after 30 games due to the coronavirus pandemic. Saints finished 9th, after average points per game played was used to determine final league placings.

Squad list

Results & fixtures

Pre season / Friendlies

Scottish Premiership

Scottish League Cup

Scottish Cup

Player statistics

Appearances and goals

|-
|colspan="14"|Players who left the club during the season:
|-

{{Efs player4|no=15|name=Jack Baird (on loan to Greenock Morton)|pos=DF|nat=SCO|0|0|4|0|0|0}}

|-
|}

Goal scorers

Disciplinary record
Includes all competitive matches.Last updated 11 March 2020Team statistics

League table

Division summary

League results by opponent

Management statisticsLast updated on 11 March 2020''

Transfers

Players in

Players out

See also
List of St Mirren F.C. seasons

Notes

References

St Mirren F.C. seasons
St Mirren